Changnyeong Daeseong High School is a school located in Daehab township of Changnyeong County.

Overview
The school collaborates with many educational agencies such as Changnyeong's Youth Cultural center and has recently established a MOU (업무협약) on the 21st of March 2013.

See also
Changnyeong

References

External links
 Changnyeong Daeseong High School official website

High schools in South Korea
Schools in South Gyeongsang Province
Changnyeong County
Educational institutions established in 1948
1948 establishments in Korea